Giovanni Martina (born 20 January 1987) is an Italian footballer who plays for Bassano.

Biography
Born in Vittorio Veneto, the Province of Treviso, Martina started his career at Treviso. In his last year with Treviso's under-20 youth team, he also played 3 Serie B games. In the first game he replaced Gianni Guigou in the 63rd minute on 8 October 2006, drawing 0–0 with Piacenza. In July 2007 he was loaned to Pizzighettone along with Eros Bagnara. On 1 July 2008 Martina returned to Treviso but only played 2 times in Serie B, which the team relegated and then bankrupted.

On 5 August 2009 he joined Bassano on free transfer. He played a career high of 13 games, and in June his contract was extended. That season despite finished seventh in the Group B of 2009–10 Lega Pro Seconda Divisione, the team promoted to Prima Divisione to fill the vacancies by the bankrupted teams. He only played 4 times in his maiden Prima Divisione season before moved to fellow Prima Divisione team Viareggio (but from another group, Group B), in exchange with forward Cristian Longobardi. he was the understudy of Nicolò Brighenti; just played four times: started once as right-back (but sent off at first half), replacing centre-back Lorenzo Fiale once and left-back Davide Bertolucci twice respectively.

References

External links
 Football.it Profile 

Italian footballers
Serie B players
Treviso F.B.C. 1993 players
A.S. Pizzighettone players
Bassano Virtus 55 S.T. players
F.C. Esperia Viareggio players
Association football fullbacks
People from Vittorio Veneto
1987 births
Living people
Footballers from Veneto
Sportspeople from the Province of Treviso